Berekszó is the Hungarian name for two villages in Romania:

 Bârsău village, Hărău Commune, Hunedoara County
 Beregsău Mare village, Săcălaz Commune, Timiș County